The 2013 Geelong Football Club season was the club's 114th season of senior competition in the Australian Football League (AFL). The club also fielded its reserves team in the Victorian Football League (VFL) for the 14th season.

Club personnel

Playing list
 Players are listed in alphabetical order by surname, and statistics are for AFL regular season and finals series matches during the 2013 AFL season only.

Season summary

Pre-season matches

Regular season

Ladder

Finals series

Awards, Records & Milestones

 Milestones
 Round 1 - Josh Caddy (Geelong debut)
 Round 1 - Jared Rivers (Geelong debut)
 Round 1 - Mark Blicavs (AFL debut)
 Round 3 - Tom Lonergan (100 games)
 Round 6 - Corey Enright (250 games)
 Round 6 - Steve Johnson (200 games)
 Round 7 - Jackson Thurlow (AFL debut)
 Round 9 - Trent West (50 games)
 Round 9 - George Burbury (AFL debut)
 Round 16 - Joel Selwood (150 games)

 AFL Awards

VFL season

Squad

Results

Notes
 Key

 H ^ Home match.
 A ^ Away match.

 Notes
Geelong's scores are indicated in bold font.

References

External links
 Official website of the Geelong Football Club
 Official website of the Australian Football League

2013
Geelong Football Club